"Break Up" is the first single from Mario's fourth studio album D.N.A.. It features and was co-written by Gucci Mane and Sean Garrett with production and additional writing from Shondrae "Bangladesh" Crawford. The single was first premiered on the radio station V-103 at  March 30, 2009 with Greg Street.

Background and composition

According to Mario, "it's a little bit of everything on this record. That's why I love it. Sean is like a brother to me. He knows me. So, when he did this record, he was definitely thinking about me. It’s a club record and every man has experienced this situation before. It's like why would you want to break up with me when you gon' get the same thing with the next man. But, he ain't gon do it as fly as I can. I can't wait to perform it. It's going to be a movie. Look for the movie! We're not calling this a single or a video, we're calling it a movie."

The song, mixed by Fabian, was composed using a loop from Image-Line's FL Studio software named "flute riff". The drums are simplistic and resemble Bangladesh's previous productions such as Beyoncé's "Diva" and Lil Wayne's "A Milli". Some vocals in the chorus sample Surf Club's "I Can't Miss".

Critical reception
Burmy from DjBooth.net speaks that "While Gucci Mane's guest verse (no, this is not some late April Fools' joke) might seem unnecessary to some, Sean Garrett's writing and background vocals, together with Bangladesh's repetitive, percussion-heavy beat (similar to his work on A Milli and Diva) add up to what could be one of the most widely-spun singles of spring/summer '09!".

Other versions
Various unofficial remixes were made with Mario, Gucci Mane and Sean Garrett still included: one with Bow Wow, another with Nicki Minaj and the last featuring Rick Ross and Young Breed.

American rapper Tyga made a freestyle of the song. R&B singer Trey Songz released a version called "Wake Up" with changed lyrics.
Lil Wayne also did a remix on his No Ceilings mixtape.

Music video
The music video for "Break Up" was shot in the second week of June, as Sean Garrett stated, most of the video was filmed in a new complex, which boasted top-of-the-line architecture, was on the harbor, and had a view of the city of Baltimore with director Chris Robinson. The scenes shot in the bedroom were in Mario's bedroom; he stated he felt a little feeling of invasion of privacy because he is not used to being with a girl in bed while having cameras around. Audra Simmons of RichGirl plays the role of Mario's girlfriend who wants to break up with him. In the video it is shown that they argue and he is not a trustworthy boyfriend, as he is seen flirting with another girl in a club. He still tries to look for her, however, remarking in the song that although he cheats he loves her. Brave (Christina Williams), from RichGirl, also makes a short appearance in which she and Audra are shown catching Mario in the act with another girl. In Sean Garrett's part, model Rosa Acosta makes an appearance. In May, Mario stated that the video was coming soon. On July 2, Mario announced on his Twitter that he would be on 106 & Park to premiere the music video, although the video did not premiered and was set to premier on the following week. On July 7, was announced on his website that the music video premiered on 9 of July exclusively on WorldStarHipHop.

The song quickly rose on BET video countdown show 106 & Park it debuted at number 10, moving to number 7. On July 22 the video moved up to number 3 on the countdown. By the end of the week, the video went to number 1 on the countdown. Due its success, it was placed at number 7 on BET's Notarized: Top 100 Videos of 2009 countdown.

Chart performance
Mario asked to all his fans to request "Break Up". He said that he needed 2000 more spins before going for ads in three weeks.

The song first appeared on the Billboard Bubbling Under R&B/Hip-Hop Singles chart at number 11, peaking at 10 the following week. It later entered on the Billboard Hot R&B/Hip-Hop Songs, peaking at number 86. Initially, the song charted on the Billboard Bubbling Under Hot 100 at number 17. On the chart week of July 4, 2009, the song debuted on the Billboard Hot 100 chart at number 98 and peaked at number 14, becoming the highest-charting single to date for Sean Garrett. It has also become Mario's third highest-charting single in the US after "Let Me Love You" and "Just a Friend 2002". It got the position of number 7 on BET's Notarized.

Credits and personnel
Songwriting – Radric Davis, Sean Garrett, Shondrae Crawford
Production – Shondrae "Mr. Bangladesh" Crawford, Sean "The Pen" Garrett
Vocal production – Sean Garrett
Recording – Miles Walker, assisted by D.P. Samuels, Kory Aaron
Mixing – Fabian Marasciullo, assisted by Edward Lidow
Featuring vocals – Gucci Mane, Sean Garrett

Charts

Weekly charts

Year-end charts

Certifications

Release history

References

2009 singles
2009 songs
Mario (singer) songs
Gucci Mane songs
Music videos directed by Chris Robinson (director)
Song recordings produced by Bangladesh (record producer)
Songs written by Sean Garrett
Songs written by Gucci Mane
Songs written by Bangladesh (record producer)